Francisco Montana and Greg Van Emburgh were the defending champions, but chose not to participate that year.

Marc-Kevin Goellner and David Prinosil won in the final 6–7, 7–5, 6–2, against Arnaud Boetsch and Olivier Delaître.

Seeds

  Steve DeVries /  David Macpherson (quarterfinals)
  Glenn Michibata /  David Pate (first round)
  Shelby Cannon /  Scott Melville (semifinals)
  Marc-Kevin Goellner /  David Prinosil (champions)

Draw

Draw

External links
Draw
Qualifying draw

Doubles